Vermont Route 142 (VT 142) is a  north–south state highway in Vermont, United States. It runs from the state border with Massachusetts as a continuation of Massachusetts Route 142 northward through the town of Vernon to the town of Brattleboro, ending at an intersection with U.S. Route 5 (US 5).

Route description

Vermont Route 142 begins at the state border in Vernon, where it continues southbound as Massachusetts Route 142 in the town of Northfield. Route 142 heads north into the town of Vernon, serving the town center before winding north towards Brattleboro. En route to the city, Route 142 parallels Interstate 91 and US-5, which run to the west, and New Hampshire Route 119, which runs just east of the Connecticut River. Route 142 spends its entire length hugging the river, never straying far from its west bank. It runs directly next to the river upon crossing into Brattleboro, proceeding into the heart of the town, where it ends at an intersection with US-5 and Route 119, which begins at the same intersection. Route 119, the second shortest Vermont route at just  in length (but fully signed nonetheless), crosses the bridge to the east, becoming NH-119 and proceeding south along the east bank of the river, opposite Route 142.

Major intersections

References

External links

142
Transportation in Windsor County, Vermont